The 2002–03 Saint Joseph's Hawks men's basketball team represented Saint Joseph's University during the 2002–03 NCAA Division I men's basketball season. Under 8th year head coach Phil Martelli, the Hawks held an overall record of 23–7 and a conference record of 12–4. In the A-10 tournament, Saint Joseph's beat La Salle before falling to Dayton in the semifinals. The Hawks earned an at-large bid to the NCAA tournament – as No. 7 seed in the East region – where they lost in overtime to Auburn in the opening round.

Roster

Schedule and results

|-
!colspan=9 style=| Regular Season

|-
!colspan=9 style=| Atlantic 10 Tournament

|-
!colspan=9 style=| NCAA Tournament

Rankings

References

Saint Joseph's
Saint Joseph's
Saint Joseph's Hawks men's basketball seasons